Żdżar may refer to the following places:
Żdżar, Masovian Voivodeship (east-central Poland)
Żdżar, Koszalin County in West Pomeranian Voivodeship (north-west Poland)
Żdżar, Szczecinek County in West Pomeranian Voivodeship (north-west Poland)